Joyce Marie Cusack (born May 21, 1942) is an American politician. She is a former member of the Florida House of Representatives, representing the 27th District and a member of the Democratic Party. Her district covered a part of Volusia County, Florida.

Cusack was born in New Smyrna Beach, Florida, and resides in DeLand, Florida. She received her associate's degree in nursing from Daytona Beach Community College (now Daytona State College) in 1971 and her bachelor's degree in psychology from Saint Leo University in Saint Leo, Florida in 1984.

She was first elected to the House in 2000, when she defeated Pat Patterson for the District 26 seat, and was subsequently re-elected in 2004.

Some of the committees that Cusack was affiliated with were Trade and Banking, Health Care General, Select Committee on Medicaid Reform, Spaceport and Technology, State Infrastructure Council, Transportation and Economic Development Appropriations.

Cusack was re-elected to a fourth term in the Florida House, beating former Ormond Beach Mayor Dave Hood with about 63 percent of the vote, according to unofficial results on November 7, 2006. Her victory led a trend of incumbent representatives winning re-election to the Florida House of Representatives.  She served as the Democratic Leader pro tempore of the Florida House in 2006, which made her the number two ranking Democratic member.

Cusack was awarded an honorary doctorate degree from Bethune-Cookman University in 2007, she left the Florida Legislature in May 2008 due to term limits. In November 2010, she won the Volusia County Council at-large seat defeating Margie Patchett. In 2014, Cusack retained her at-large seat, defeating Pat Northey.

Personal life
She was married to Charles Cusack Jr. (deceased), and has two grown daughters, and three grandchildren.

She is a member of Delta Sigma Theta sorority.

References  

1942 births
Living people
African-American nurses
American nurses
American women nurses
African-American state legislators in Florida
African-American women in politics
Democratic Party members of the Florida House of Representatives
People from DeLand, Florida
People from New Smyrna Beach, Florida
Saint Leo University alumni
Women state legislators in Florida
Daytona State College
21st-century American politicians
21st-century American women politicians
21st-century African-American women
21st-century African-American politicians
20th-century African-American people
20th-century African-American women